Club Bolívar is a Bolivian professional football club that currently plays in the Bolivian Primera División. Founded in 1925 in honor of Venezuelan military leader Simón Bolívar, it is the most successful and popular club in the history of Bolivian football, with 30 titles. The club was founded with a light blue color, which is why it is sometimes nicknamed "Celeste" (The Sky Blue).

The club has two stadiums. Estadio Libertador Simón Bolívar, which has a capacity for 5,000 people and is located in the Tembladerani neighborhood of La Paz, is only used for training sessions and friendly matches. Estadio Hernando Siles, which holds a capacity for 41,143 people, is the club's main stadium, and is used for official matches.

Bolívar began playing the amateur era two years after its foundation, in 1927, where it finished runner-up, and it was in the 1932 tournament that the club won its first championship title. The club won consecutive championships in the years of 1939, 1940, 1941, and 1942, becoming the second team to achieve a four-time championship. In this way, from 1927 to 1949 the club obtained a total of 6 amateur titles.

In the professional era, the club won the first tournament of the Bolivian Primera División in 1950. According to International Federation of Football History & Statistics (IFFHS) statistics, Club Bolívar is the best Bolivian football team of the 20th century and the first decade of the 21st century.

At an international level, Club Bolívar is statistically the club that has best represented Bolivia in international tournaments. The Bolivian club is in the 11th position of the Historical table of the Copa Libertadores; it has participated 35 times in this tournament, being in this way the seventh team at the South American level with the most participations and also the eleventh team with most victories in the history of the Libertadores, with 92 in total. Among its 34 appearances in the Copa Libertadores, its best performances were in the 1986 and 2014 editions, where Bolivar finished as a semi-finalist.

Bolívar played its first international final in 2004, where it was runner-up to Boca Juniors in that year's Copa Sudamericana. Bolivar has 10 participations in this tournament.

Among the best players in Bolivar's history are Marco "El Diablo" Etcheverry, Erwin "Platini" Sanchez, Julio Baldivieso, Carlos Borja, Vladimir Soria, Ramiro Blacut, Víctor Ugarte, Carlos Aragones, Juan Miguel "Juanmi" Callejon, Walter Flores, Juan Carlos Arce, Joaquín Botero and many more.

History

Foundation 

Until well into the 1980s there was controversy regarding the date of creation of the institution. The year 1927 was considered accurate until it became clear that it had been founded in 1925, the year of the country's centenary.

The club was born on April 12, 1925 by a group of friends who had the idea of forming a social club whose objective was to practice sport, especially football. They met in a modest colonial center house of La Paz, specifically on Junín street and less than two blocks from Plaza Murillo, where it was decided to create the club with an unusual name, Bolívar, contrary to the usual names of Bolivian teams back then, as most of them were created with names in English. Names such as Franz Tamayo or Antonio José de Sucre were thought of, but in homage to the Liberator Simón Bolívar, the group decided for Bolívar.

Despite the fact that the founders had as a dominant passion for the practice of football, as was the style at the time, they decided to add the additional denominative of "musical literary club; that is, the club was originally founded with the name of "Club Atlético Literario Musical Bolívar" which was soon diluted by the strength of the football team and its distinctive achievements, being reduced only to Club Bolívar.

Don Humberto Bonifacio was in charge of the club's management on a provisional basis, until the first president was elected by a democratic election. The first president was Carlos Terán, who was accompanied by Ernesto Sainz, Héctor Salcedo, Rafael Navarro, and Felipe Gutiérrez.

Amateur Age 

In 1927, two years after its founding, the Club Bolívar officially enrolled in La Paz Fútbol Association, Bolívar for the first time participated in an official championship, which was played on the Miraflores field, where the club was runner-up.

The first team that disputed the 1927 championship in which, as a debutante, they achieved the runner-up behind Nimbles Sport was made up of Walter Miranda, Enrique Tellería, Felipe Gutiérrez Nieto, Víctor Leclere, Carlos Terán, Germán Garnica , Roberto Segaline, Miguel Carreón, Luis Ernesto Sanz, and the captain Humberto Barreda. Alfredo Molina, Roberto Gómez and Carlos Álvarez were incorporated a year later.

The club's first international friendly match was played on June 3, 1927 against Coquimbo Unido of Chile in La Paz, losing 2-1. On May 11, 1930, the official championship begins and ends on July 30 at the main stadium Estadio Hernando Siles, with Bolívar finishing runner-up on seven points.

In 1931 the tournament was fulfilled with poor performances by  teams that did not have good youth divisions, limiting the championship to only four teams. That same year, on July 8, Club Bolívar obtained its first international victory against Gimnasia y Tiro de Salta, which it defeated 2-1 in La Paz.

A fundamental event in this first part of the club's history occurred in 1932 when Bolívar achieved the first championship in its history played in two series. The captain of that Bolívar and one of the great South American players in history was center forward Mario Alborta, who was also captain of the Bolivia national team. The contest began on May 26, but had to be suspended for a month due to the events of the Chaco War between Bolivia and Paraguay, more specifically the Battle of Boquerón, which was fought from September 7-29. The La Paz Football Association established that the location and score of the moment were recognized in the final table. For this reason, Club Bolívar was declared champion of that year. The runner-up was The Strongest, who from that year on would be the most important rival of the Bolivaristas.

In the following two years, 1933 and 1934, the tournaments were suspended until the end of the war event facing the country. After the war, the championship was restarted a year later, in 1935. The team was champion for the second time in 1937.

Bolívar was runner-up in 1938, and after that was champion for four consecutive years between 1939 and 1942, achieving the four-time championship. That team was led by players Walter Saavedra, Rojas, Romero, Plaza, Gutiérrez, and Garzón.

1947 is an important year for Bolívar and for Bolivian football, because of Víctor Agustín Ugarte's debut with the "celeste" jersey of Bolivar. The Tupiceño came to La Paz to test himself and from the first day, showed his quality. He made his debut against Ferroviario and that same year he debuted in the Bolivia national team. Many people consider him the best Bolivian player in history. He played as right-wing in the old 2-3-5 scheme.

Mario Mercado and Professional era 
Mario Mercado became President of Bolivar in 1961. In 1986, CONMEBOL honored him with a unique distinction of being president for 25 years. On 21 January 1995, he died when his private jet crashed in Oruro en route to Sucre. Aside from football, he was also mayor of the city of La Paz. Under his management, Estadio Hernando Siles was renovated and Estadio Libertador, the club's reserve stadium, was opened in January 1976. 

Notable achievements during this era were reaching the 1986 Copa Libertadores semi-finals, and winning back to back league titles in 1987 and 1988, as well as 1991 and 1992.

Mauro Cuellar and BAISA era 
In the early 2000s, Mauro Cuellar assumed presidency of Bolivar. During Cuellar's administration, Bolivar reached the finals of the 2004 Copa Sudamericana, losing the final to Boca Juniors 2-1 on aggregate. However, despite the club's sporting achievements, it fell into a deep financial crisis, nearly disappearing with debts in excess of USD 5 million, until Bolivian millionaire Marcelo Claure took over the club in September 2008 through BAISA, a subsidiary company owned by Claure. BAISA owns the right to operate the club for 20 years, and has projects to win a continental title, as well as a full stadium and training centre by the club's 100th anniversary.

In 2014, the team reached the Copa Libertadores semi-finals, being eliminated by Argentine club San Lorenzo 5-1 on aggregate, with a 5-0 loss in Buenos Aires but with a 1-0 win in the second leg at home. In 2017, Bolivar won both Apertura and Clausura tournaments that year, therefore completing a "bicampeonato" (two-time consecutive championship). In January 2021, Club Bolivar was announced as the first Partner Club of City Football Group. Also in January 2021, the club's "Plan Centenario" was announced, which is a five-year plan to construct an academy, open the club's ownership to fans, and win a "tricampeonato" (three-time consecutive championship) or reach a CONMEBOL final, all by 2025, the club's centenary year.

Kit

Colors 
Bolivar's traditional home colors are light blue, traditional away colors are dark blue or white.

Rivalry
Bolivar's classic rival is The Strongest. Both teams are from La Paz, and both teams are the most successful in Bolivian football, with Bolivar having 30 titles to its name while The Strongest has 15.
Total matches: 262
Bolivar wins: 113
Ties: 86
The Strongest wins: 63

Honours
First Division – LPFB/División Profesional Era: 30
1950, 1953, 1956, 1966, 1968, 1976, 1978, 1982, 1983, 1985, 1987, 1988, 1991, 1992, 1994, 1996, 1997, 2002, 2004-A, 2005-AD, 2006-C, 2009-A, 2011-AD, 2013-C, 2014-A, 2015-C, 2017-A, 2017-C, 2019-A, 2022-A

Liga de Fútbol Amateur Boliviano: 6
1932, 1937, 1939, 1940, 1941, 1942

Copa Aerosur: 2
2009, 2010

Copa Bolivia: 4
1979, 1989, 1990, 2001
Runner-up (3): 1980, 1992, 1999

Performance in CONMEBOL competitions
Copa Libertadores: 33 appearances
Best: Semi-finals in 1986 and 2014

Copa Sudamericana: 8 appearances
Best: Final in 2004.

Current squad

Reserve team

Out on loan

Coaching staff

Notable players
See also :Category:Club Bolívar players.

Managers

 Wilfredo Camacho
 Moises Barack
 Dan Georgiadis (1962, 1965–68)
 Ramiro Blacut (1979, 1983, 1988–89)
 Vitaly Shevchenko (1992–94)
 José Pastoriza (1994)
 Antonio López Habas (1994–95)
 Ramiro Blacut (1995)
 Jorge Habegger (January 1, 1996 – December 31, 1997)
 Antonio López Habas (2000–01)
 Vladimir Soria (2002–05)
 Jorge Habegger (January 1, 2005 – June 30, 2005)
 Carlos Aragonés (2005–06)
 Víctor Hugo Antelo (2007)
 Jorge Habegger (March 1, 2008 – October 9, 2008)
 Gustavo Quinteros (January 1, 2009 – December 31, 2009)
 Santiago Escobar (July 19, 2009 – June 30, 2010)
 Néstor Clausen (June 12, 2010 – December 12, 2010)
 Guillermo Hoyos (January 1, 2011 – May 13, 2012)
 Miguel Ángel Portugal (July 1, 2012 – December 31, 2013)
 Xabier Azkargorta (March 9, 2014–15)
 Eduardo Villegas (2015)
 Rubén Darío Insúa (January 1, 2016 – April 16)
 Óscar Villegas (April 2016 – May 16)
 Beñat San José (May 2016 – December 17)
 Vinícius Eutrópio (January 2018 – June 2018)
 Alfredo Arias (June 2018 – December 2018)
 César Vigevani (December 2018 – December 2019)
 Claudio Vivas (December 2019 – October 2020)
 Wálter Flores (October 2020 – December 2020)
 Natxo González (December 2020 – present)

References

External links
 
 
 
 
 

 
Association football clubs established in 1925
Bolivar
Football clubs in La Paz
1925 establishments in Bolivia